Nihad Al Boushi (born 8 March 1973)  is a former Syrian football midfielder who played for Syria in the 1996 Asian Cup.

Personal life
His brother, Mouhanad, is also a football player.

External links

11v11.com

1973 births
Syrian footballers
Living people
Syria international footballers
Place of birth missing (living people)
PFC Krylia Sovetov Samara players
Russian Premier League players
Syrian expatriate footballers
Expatriate footballers in Russia
Syrian expatriate sportspeople in Russia
Al-Ittihad Aleppo players
1996 AFC Asian Cup players
Association football midfielders
Syrian Premier League players